is a video game artist, director and producer. He was employed by Square from 1993 to 1999 and is now working at Monolith Soft. He is known for his work on the Chrono series, Xeno games and Baten Kaitos series.

Early life 
Yasuyuki Honne was born on March 5, 1971. When he was young, Honne enjoyed video games and playing fighting games in video arcades, but wanted to become a freelance illustrator. However, after graduating and moving to Tokyo, he saw a recruitment ad for Square in the magazine Gamest, with a picture of Final Fantasy VI. Since his design studies had made him interested in the relationship between a person's life and fantasy art, Honne decided to apply for a job at the company.

Career 
Honne joined Square as a graphic artist in 1993 and notably worked on Front Mission and  Chrono Trigger under graphic director Tetsuya Takahashi. Honne then served as the art director of Square's Product Development Division-3 on Xenogears and Chrono Cross. In 1999, Honne left Square to join Monolith Soft, the new company founded by Takahashi, previously Xenogears' director, who had suggested that Honne and he work together again after Honne finishes working on Chrono Cross. Honne became a board member of Monolith Soft, owning 20 shares out of the total 2,400, and the director of the company's graphics development division. His position also includes handling the graphics work contracted for by external companies.

After serving as the art director for Xenosaga Episode I: Der Wille zur Macht, Honne made his debut as a game director on Baten Kaitos: Eternal Wings and the Lost Ocean, the project that has left him with the fondest memories since the founding of Monolith Soft. This was followed by a prequel, Baten Kaitos Origins. Honne's first project as a game producer was Dragon Ball Z: Attack of the Saiyans, during which he gained experience on the handling of licensed characters. When Takahashi was in the planning stages for the project that would become Xenoblade Chronicles, Honne produced a model of the two gods of the game's world in order to help explain the concept to the publisher Nintendo. Honne is currently working on an unannounced title. As of October 2011, he is part of Monolith Soft's new Kyoto studio.

Personal life 
Honne is married. He enjoys traveling, and his hobbies include practicing judo (he is black belt) and playing plucked string instruments.

Games credited 
Honne has been credited with the following games:

 Front Mission (1995): assistant graphic designer
 Chrono Trigger (1995): map designer
 Treasure Conflix (1996): main graphic
 Xenogears (1998): art director, map textures
 Chrono Cross (1999): art director, map painter
 Xenosaga Episode I: Der Wille zur Macht (2002): art director, map designer
 Baten Kaitos: Eternal Wings and the Lost Ocean (2003): director, art director, map painter
 Dirge of Cerberus -Final Fantasy VII- (2006): special thanks
 Baten Kaitos Origins (2006): director, art director, map painter, opening movie
 Super Smash Bros. Brawl (2008): Adventure Mode map design
 Dragon Ball Z: Attack of the Saiyans (2009): producer, art director
 Xenoblade Chronicles (2010): concept model
 The Legend of Zelda: Skyward Sword (2011): special thanks
 Project X Zone (2012): map graphic supervisor
 Animal Crossing: New Leaf (2012): special thanks
 Pikmin 3 (2012): special thanks
 The Legend of Zelda: A Link Between Worlds (2013): special thanks
 Splatoon (2015): special thanks
 Animal Crossing: Happy Home Designer (2015): special thanks
 Project X Zone 2 (2015): map graphic supervisor
 The Legend of Zelda: Breath of the Wild (2017): special thanks
 Splatoon 2 (2017): special thanks
 Xenoblade Chronicles 2 (2017): artwork

References

External links
Duende, Yasuyuki Honne's personal blog 
 

1971 births
Japanese video game designers
Living people
Japanese speculative fiction artists
Video game artists
Japanese video game directors
Japanese video game producers
Fantasy artists
Square Enix people